Sergio Tesitore (born 10 February 1967) is a Uruguayan former cyclist. He competed in the individual road race at the 1992 Summer Olympics.

References

1967 births
Living people
Uruguayan male cyclists
Olympic cyclists of Uruguay
Cyclists at the 1992 Summer Olympics
People from Canelones Department